Jaqueline Orth (born 10 February 1993) is a German sport shooter.

She participated at the 2018 ISSF World Shooting Championships, winning a medal.

References

External links

Living people
1993 births
German female sport shooters
ISSF rifle shooters
People from Bad Hersfeld
Sportspeople from Kassel (region)
Shooters at the 2010 Summer Youth Olympics
21st-century German women